Maireella is a genus of fungi in the class Dothideomycetes. The relationship of this taxon to other taxa within the class is unknown (incertae sedis).

The genus name of Maireella is in honour of René Charles Joseph Ernest Maire (1878–1949), who was a French botanist and mycologist.

The genus was circumscribed in Ann. Mycol. vol.6 on page 145 in 1908.

See also 
 List of Dothideomycetes genera incertae sedis

References

External links 
 Maireella at Index Fungorum

Dothideomycetes enigmatic taxa
Dothideomycetes genera